Biblical literalist chronology is the attempt to correlate the historical dates used in the Bible with the chronology of actual events, typically starting with creation in Genesis 1:1. Some of the better-known calculations include Archbishop James Ussher, who placed it in 4004 BC, Isaac Newton in 4000 BC (both off the Masoretic Hebrew Bible), Martin Luther in 3961 BC, the traditional Hebrew calendar date of 3760 BC, and lastly the dates based on the Septuagint, of roughly 4650 BC. The dates between the Septuagint & Masoretic are conflicting by 650 years between the genealogy of Arphaxad to Nahor in Genesis 11:12-24. The Masoretic text which lacks the 650 years of the Septuagint is the text used by most modern Bibles. There is no consensus of which is right, however, without the additional 650 years in the Septuagint, according to Egyptologists the great Pyramids of Giza would pre-date the Flood (yet show no signs of water erosion) and provide no time for Tower of Babel event.

Background 
The Jewish Bible (the Christian Old Testament) dates events either by simple arithmetic taking the creation of the world as the starting point, or, in the later books, by correlations between the reigns of kings in Israel and Judah. The data it provides falls into three periods:
 From the Creation to Abraham's migration to Canaan, during which events are dated by adding the ages of the patriarchs;
 From Abraham's migration to the foundation of Solomon's temple, in which the chronology in Genesis continues to be arrived at by adding ages, but from Exodus on is usually given in statements;
 From the foundation of the temple onward, which gives the reigns in years (sometimes shorter periods) of kings in Israel and Judah.

Some believe that for the biblical authors the chronology was theological in intent, functioning as prophecy and not as history. Biblical literalism, however, does not treat it this way, because literalists have a profound respect for the Bible as the word of God. This way of thinking had its origins in Christian fundamentalism, an early-20th-century movement which opposed then-current non-supernatural interpretations of the life of Jesus by stressing, among other things, the verbal inspiration of scripture. The underlying concept, or fear, was that if anything in the Bible were not true, everything would collapse.

Literalist chronologies
The creation of a literalist chronology of the Bible faces several hurdles, of which the following are the most significant:
 There are different texts of the Jewish Bible, the major text-families being: the Septuagint, a Greek translation of the original Hebrew scriptures made in the last few centuries before Christ; the Masoretic text, a version of the Hebrew text curated by the Jewish rabbis but the earliest manuscripts of which date from the early years of the 2nd millennium CE; and the Samaritan text, restricted to the five books of the Torah plus the Book of Joshua. The three differ quite markedly from each other.
 Literalists prefer the Masoretic text, on which Protestant Bibles are based, but the Masoretic text sometimes contains absurdities, as when it states that Saul came to the throne at the age of one and reigned for two years. Such obvious errors can be corrected by reference to other versions of the Bible (in this case the Septuagint, which gives more realistic numbers), but their existence calls into question the fundamentalist idea that the MT text is the inspired word of God. Most fundamentalists, with the notable exception of the King James Only movement, avoid this by holding that only the authors of the original autographs (the very first copies written by Moses and others) were inspired by God.
 Very few events in the Bible are mentioned in outside sources, making it difficult to move from a relative chronology (X happened before Y happened) to an absolute one (X happened in a known year).
 The Bible is not always consistent. For example, Exodus 12:40 states that the Israelites spent 430 years in Egypt, while Paul in Galatians 3:17 says the 430 years covers the period from Abraham to Moses. 
 Literal interpretation of the earlier parts of Bible is in direct contradiction with modern science.

Tables
The Bible measures events from the year of God's creation of the world, a type of calendar called Anno Mundi ("Year of the World"), shortened as AM. The task of a literal biblical chronology is to convert this to dates in the modern chronology expressed as years before or after Christ, BC and AD. There have been many attempts to do this, none of them universally accepted. The following tables (derived from Thomas L. Thompson, The Mythic Past; notes within the table as cited) divide the Bible's AM dates by the three periods into which they most naturally fall.

Creation to Abraham's migration to Canaan

Abraham's entry into Canaan to the foundation of Solomon's temple

After Solomon's temple

Example of literalist chronology 

The following tabulation of years and dates is according to the literal letter of the text of the Bible alone. Links to multiple translations and versions are provided for verification. For comparison, known historically dated events are associated with the resultant literal dates. Dates according to the famous Ussher chronology appear in small type italics "" (Latin: "Year of the World"), "" (Latin: "Before Christ"). In ancient Israel a part year was designated as the previous king's last year and the new king's 1st year. The arithmetic can be checked by starting at the bottom of the table with the date of the destruction of the Temple in 587 and adding the number of years in the Scriptures (books of the Prophets and Chronicles through Genesis) back up to the beginning. For the period after 587 BCE known historical dates are used as referents. Biblical source texts for stated numbers of years are referenced and linked. Reference sources are the RSVCE, The New American Bible The Timetables of History by Bernard Grun, and the Holman Illustrated Bible Dictionary (2003).

Adam to the Flood 4246–2590 BC

The Flood to Abram 2589–2211 BCE

Abraham to Joseph 2198–1936 BCE

Egypt to the Exodus 1914–1577 BCE

The Wilderness Period to the Conquest of Canaan 1576–1505 BCE

The Judges to the United Monarchy 1505–1018 BCE

The Divided Monarchy to the Destruction of the Temple 982–587 BCE

The Babylonian Captivity to the Decree of Cyrus 586–539 BCE

The Second Temple to Alexander the Great 538–334 BCE

Jaddua the high priest to John Hyrcanus 333–104 BCE

Esther 11:1the 4th year of Ptolemy and Cleopatra as possibly 78–77 BCE

2 Maccabees 1:10–12Aristobulus II 66–63 BCE

See also 
 Council of Jamnia
 Dating creation
 History of ancient Israel and Judah
 Intertestamental period
 Universal history
 Young earth creationism

Notes

References

Citations

Bibliography 

 
 
 
 
 
 
 
 
 
 
 
 
 
 
 
 
 
 
 
 
 
 
 
 
 
 
 
 
 
 
 
 
 
 
 
 

Bible-related controversies
Christian fundamentalism
Christian theology of the Bible
Chronology
Hebrew Bible studies
Hebrew calendar
Bible
Timelines of Christianity